Cornukaempferia aurantiflora is a species in the ginger family, Zingiberaceae. It was first described by John Donald Mood and Kai Larsen.

References 

Zingiberoideae